Alexei Ivanovich Radzievsky, transliterated in several different ways, including Aleksei, Aleksey, Alexey, and Radzievskii, Radzievskiy (born 31 July old style, or 13 August new style, 1911, died 1978), was a professional soldier of the Soviet Union who fought in the Second World War, commanding the 2nd Guards Tank Army during the Lublin–Brest Offensive and afterwards. He later rose to the rank of full Army General and was the author of works on military strategy.

From 1969 to 1978 Radzievsky was Commandant of the M. V. Frunze Military Academy and in February 1978 was made a Hero of the Soviet Union, the highest Soviet award.

Life
Born in Uman, now in the Cherkasy region of central Ukraine, Radzievsky left school in 1927 to work as a moulder in a silica plant in his home town of Uman. In 1929 he joined the Red Army and graduated from the Cavalry School in 1931, going on to command first a platoon, later a squadron. In 1938 he attended the M. V. Frunze Military Academy and in 1941 passed the Military Academy of the General Staff.

With the outbreak of hostilities with the Axis Powers in July 1941, he joined the newly formed 53rd (4th Guards) Cavalry Division and saw fighting in the Demidov, Dukhovshchina, and the Battle of Moscow, then with the Cavalry Corps fought at the Kharkov, in the crossing of the Dnieper, and in the liberation of Kiev, Zhytomyr, and other cities. On 28 February 1944 Radzievsky was appointed Chief of staff of the 2nd Guards Tank Army with the rank of Major General. In July 1944, during the Lublin–Brest Offensive, the Army's commanding officer, Lieutenant-General Semyon Bogdanov, was seriously wounded, and Radzievsky took over his command, which he retained until January 1945. His forces took a leading role in the liberation of a string of Polish cities, including Lublin, Siedlce, Łuków, Skierniewice, Lovech, and Łódź.

At the end of July 1944 Radzievsky's 2nd Guards Tank Army routed the German 73rd Infantry Division at Garwolin, capturing its commander, Friedrich Franek, and in the next four days the army advanced to the edge of Warsaw, with five hundred tanks still operational. However, the Warsaw Uprising had begun on 1 August, and the Soviets did not seek to take the Polish capital until January 1945. On 2 November 1944 Radzievsky was promoted Lieutenant General.

After the war, Radzievsky's combat experience made him a good soldier for training officers. He served as commanding officer of the Army KA (1945–1947), of the Northern Armed Forces Group (1950–1952), the Turkestan Military District (1952–1953), the Odessa Military District (1954–1959). From 1959 to 1968 he was first deputy Commandant of the Military Academy of the General Staff, then from 1968 to 1969 commander of the Control Office of Military Studies. His last posting, from July 1969 to February 1978 was as Commandant of the M. V. Frunze Military Academy.

Radzievsky was twice awarded the Order of Lenin and was also appointed as a member of the Order of the Red Banner, the Order of Kutuzov (1st class), the Order of Suvorov (2nd class), and of many other Soviet and foreign Orders. In 1972 he achieved the rank of Army General and in 1978 was made a Hero of the Soviet Union.

Publications
A. I. Radzievsky, ed., Akademiya imeni M. V. Frunze: Istoriya voennoi ordena Lenina Krasnoznamennoi ordena Suvorova Akademyi ("The Academy Named after M. V. Frunze: History of the Order of Lenin Red Banner, Order of Suvorov Military Academy") (Moscow: Voyenizdat, 1972)
A. I. Radzievsky, ed., Taktika v boevykh primerakh (polk) ("Tactics by combat example (the regiment)") (Moscow: Voyenisdat, 1974)
A. I. Radzievsky, ed., Taktika v boevykh primerakh (diviziia) ("Tactics by combat example (the division)") (Moscow: Voyenizdat, 1976)
A. I. Radzievsky, Tankovyi udar ("Tank strike") (Moscow: Voyenizdat, 1977)
A. I. Radzievsky, Proryv ("Penetration") (Moscow: Voyenizdat, 1979)

Notes

1911 births
1978 deaths
Army generals (Soviet Union)
Heroes of the Soviet Union
Recipients of the Order of Lenin
Recipients of the Order of the Red Banner
People from Uman
Recipients of the Order of Suvorov, 1st class
Recipients of the Order of Kutuzov, 1st class
Recipients of the Order of Suvorov, 2nd class
Recipients of the Medal "For Distinction in Guarding the State Border of the USSR"
Commanders of the Order of the British Empire
Knights of the Virtuti Militari
Recipients of the Order of the Cross of Grunwald, 2nd class
Recipients of the Cross of Valour (Poland)
Commanders of the Order of Polonia Restituta
Frunze Military Academy alumni
Military Academy of the General Staff of the Armed Forces of the Soviet Union alumni
Commandants of the Frunze Military Academy